Biscogniauxia marginata is a species of fungus in the family Xylariaceae. A plant pathogen, it was given its current name by Czech mycologist Zdeněk Pouzar in 1979.

References

Fungi described in 1979
Fungal plant pathogens and diseases
Xylariales
Taxa named by Elias Magnus Fries